Dye is a surname. Notable people with the surname include:

Alice Dye (1927–2019), American golfer and golf course designer; wife of Pete Dye
Babe Dye (1897–1962), Canadian hockey forward
Brad Dye (1933–2018), American politician
Cameron Dye (born 1959), American actor
Dale Dye (born 1944), American actor
David William Dye (1887–1932), English physicist
Donteea Dye (born 1993), American football player
Doug Dye (1921–2005), New Zealand microbiologist
Ernest Dye (born 1971), American football offensive lineman
Eva Emery Dye (1855–1947), American writer, historian, and suffragist
Gladden Dye, American college football coach 
Graham Dye (born 1961), English musician
Henry Abel Dye (1926–1986), American mathematician
Jeff Dye, American comedian
Jermaine Dye (born 1974), American baseball right fielder
John Dye (born 1963), American actor
John Dye (cricketer) (born 1942), English cricketer
Kenneth M. Dye (born 1936), Canadian Auditor-General
Leighton Dye (1901–1977), American hurdler
Les Dye (1916–2000), American football player
Marvin R. Dye (1895–1997), New York judge
Nancy Dye, American college president
Pat Dye (1939–2020), American college football coach
Pete Dye (1925–2020), American golf course designer
Sidney Dye (1900–1958), British politician
Stanley Dye (1908–2003), Canadian politician
Steven Dye (born 1963), English musician
Thomas R. Dye, American political scientist
Tippy Dye (1915–2012), American college basketball coach
Troy Dye (born 1996), American football player

de:Dye